Peter La Touche may refer to:
 Peter La Touche (1733–1828), Irish politician, MP for Leitrim 1783–90 and 1796–98
 Peter La Touche (died 1830), Irish politician, MP for Leitrim 1802–06, nephew of the earlier MP of the same name